The women's 7.5 kilometre sprint at the 2007 Asian Winter Games was held on 29 January 2007 at Beida Lake Skiing Resort, China.

Schedule
All times are China Standard Time (UTC+08:00)

Results
Legend
DNF — Did not finish

 Tamami Tanaka was awarded bronze because of no three-medal sweep per country rule.

References

Results

External links
Official website

Women Sprint